J37 may refer to:
 Elongated square gyrobicupola, a Johnson solid (J37)
 Honda J37, an automobile engine
 Jardine Strategic Holdings, a Singaporean holding company
 Laryngitis
 LNER Class J37, a British steam locomotive class
 Lockheed J37, an American turbojet engine
 Studer J37, a Swiss audio recorder